National Route 192 is a national highway of Japan connecting Saijō, Ehime and Tokushima, Tokushima in Japan, with a total length of 138.3 km (85.94 mi).

References

National highways in Japan
Roads in Ehime Prefecture
Roads in Tokushima Prefecture